A Message to Garcia is a 1936 American adventure spy film directed by George Marshall and starring Wallace Beery, Barbara Stanwyck and John Boles. The film is inspired by the 1899 essay "A Message to Garcia" by Elbert Hubbard, loosely based on an incident during the ramp up to the Spanish–American War. The essay had previously been made into a 1916 silent film, also called A Message to Garcia. In the story, U.S. Army Lieutenant Rowan, under cover, carries a secret message from President McKinley to General García, the leader of a rebellion against Spanish rule on the island of Cuba.

Plot
The film opens with the Maine Incident in which an American warship blew up in Havana harbor, allegedly following sabotage by Spain, triggering the outbreak of the Spanish–American War. President William McKinley, wishing to make contact with General Calixto García, the leader of the Cuban War of Independence against Spain, summons a U.S. Army officer, First Lieutenant Andrew S. Rowan, to the White House and gives him a message which he is to personally deliver into Garcia's hands.

Rowan first travels to British Jamaica where, posing as a Canadian merchant sailor, he joins the crew of a neutral British ship on its way to Cuba. But the Spanish have already discovered the mission and have hired the cynical, amoral Dr. Ivan Krug to identify the American and stop him before he can reach Garcia. Krug takes passage on the British ship and questions everyone on board. This leads Rowan to jump ship at night in a row boat and slip into Cuba.

There, continuing to dodge Krug and Spanish soldiers, Rowan meets a con man, Sergeant Dory, who is a deserter from the U.S. Marine Corps. Dory guides him to the home of a Cuban patriot who knows Garcia's whereabouts. But Spanish soldiers kill the patriot. So Rowan and Dory set out in the company of Raphaelita Maderos, the patriot's daughter.

Aided by villages of Cuban patriots, the three make their way toward their destination. Spanish troops led by Krug remain constantly on their trail, forcing them to hide in the swamp. They also encounter Henry Piper, a British merchant from Sheffield, who has become lost in the Cuban interior. The Spanish succeed in wounding Maderos and Dory removes the bullet from her. So Rowan must continue on without her, leaving Dory behind to provide care and protection. But she orders Dory to go after Rowan to make sure he gets safely to his destination, believing that his message is more important than any one of their lives.

Dory successfully guides Rowan across an alligator-infested river and past Spanish patrols, delivering him to what he believes are General Garcia's headquarters. Then Dory departs, not realizing that the Spaniards had recently taken the stronghold. Rowan thus falls into the hands of the Spanish, and Doctor Krug begins a process of torture to discover the whereabouts of the message that Rowan has hidden in the barrel of his pistol.

Dory, meanwhile, is captured by the Cuban rebels who wish to execute him for having previously sold them useless ammunition. Dory's personal appeal to Garcia for help to rescue Rowan, who he now realizes is in Spanish hands, is refused and he faces the firing squad. Only the dramatic arrival of the British merchant Piper, who verifies the truth of Dory's story, saves the American from being shot. Garcia then organizes a rescue attempt, which Dory volunteers for.

Rowan has resisted torture, refusing to break. But when the Spanish bring in Maderos, whom they have captured, she tries to persuade him to end his suffering and reveal the message. He still resists, holding out long enough for the Cuban rebels to launch a major assault on the Spanish position. Dory rescues Rowan but is killed in the process. Rowan, however, is then able to present McKinley's letter to Garcia, who tells him "This message means the liberation of our people."

Cast

 Wallace Beery as Sergeant Dory
 Barbara Stanwyck as Senorita Raphaelita Maderos
 John Boles as Lieutenant Rowan
 Alan Hale as Dr. Krug
 Herbert Mundin as Henry Piper
 Mona Barrie as Spanish Spy
 Enrique Acosta as General Garcia
 Juan Torena as Luis Maderos

 Martin Garralaga as Rodriguez
 Blanca Vischer as Chiquita
 Jose Luis Tortosa as Pasquale Castova
 Lucio Villegas as Commandant
 Frederick Vogeding as German Stoker
 Pat Moriarity as Irish Stoker
 Octavio Giraud as Spanish Commandant

Production
The film was made by the independent company Twentieth Century Pictures, but was distributed by 20th Century Fox following the merger between the two studios. The final day of filming was November 16, 1935. Twentieth Century had developed a reputation for producing high-budget prestige films, and this was one of the company's final efforts. The parts of Dory and Raphaelita are fictional and were created to provide roles for Beery and Stanwyck, who were well-established box office stars. The British comedian Herbert Mundin appeared to add comic relief in his role as an English merchant. Dell Henderson plays President William McKinley but with a stentorian voice dubbed by John Carradine.

Further reading 
Hulme, Peter, Cuba’s Wild East: A Literary Geography of Oriente. Liverpool, UK: Liverpool University Press, 2011.
Rice, Donald Tunnicliff. Cast in Deathless Bronze: Andrew Rowan, the Spanish–American War, and the Origins of American Empire. Morgantown WV: West Virginia University Press, 2016.

References

External links
 
 
 
 
 A Message to Garcia at TV Guide (revised version of 1987 write-up originally published in The Motion Picture Guide)

1936 films
American historical films
American war films
Films directed by George Marshall
Twentieth Century Pictures films
Films set in Washington, D.C.
Films set in Havana
Films set in Cuba
Films set in the 1890s
Spanish–American War films
1930s English-language films
1930s Spanish-language films
1930s historical films
Films produced by Darryl F. Zanuck
American black-and-white films
Films scored by Louis Silvers
20th Century Fox films
1930s war films
Cultural depictions of William McKinley
1936 multilingual films
American multilingual films
Spanish-language American films
1930s American films